Maulana Mazharul Haque Arabic and Persian University (MMHAPU) is a state university in Patna, Bihar, India. The university was established under the provisions of the Bihar State Universities Act of 1976, which took effect on 10 April 1998. 

MMHAPU is a member of the Association of Indian Universities, New Delhi as of December 2009. Although three Vice-Chancellors were appointed by the Government of Bihar between 1998 and 2008, the university did not begin admitting students until 2007. The University started its first academic session in July 2008.

The university has more than 100 Knowledge Resource Centres. At present, the school has 21 affiliated colleges, including thirtyB.Ed. College. It offers PG Semester System courses in English, Urdu, Persian, journalism, mass communication, and education.

The university has had two convocations, in 2012 and 2015. It is named after veteran freedom fighter Maulana Mazharul Haque.

References

External links
 

Universities in Patna
1998 establishments in Bihar
Educational institutions established in 1998